Annalee may refer to:
Annalee Blysse, American novelist
Annalee Davis, Barbadian artist
Annalee Dolls, company
Annalee Jefferies, American actress
Annalee Newitz, American journalist
Annalee Skarin, author
Annalee Stewart, American chaplain
Annalee Yassi, Canadian academic